A hostal is a type of lodging very common in Spain and Hispanic America. Hostals tend to be cheaper than hotels. They normally have a bar, restaurant or cafeteria where drinks and food are sold to guests and locals alike. 
  
Accommodations typically include private bedrooms, and sometimes apartments, available for either short or long term rent.  Linens and towels are usually provided, unless it is a long term apartment rental in which case the guest is considered a resident and does not receive cleaning and other services.  Guests sometimes share a common bathroom, but a number of rooms with en suite bathrooms may also be available. 

Hostals are common in Spain and are also found in Mexico, Central and South America and California.  They are often family-run, independent businesses, with a strong involvement with the local community. 

Hostal-residencias are the same as hostales, but generally without a cafetería or other place where guests can eat.

Difference from hostels 
Though the word hostal is similar to hostel, the two words refer to different types of accommodation. Hostels refers to properties that offer shared accommodation, typically in dormitories, while hostal refers to a type of family-run pension typically common only in Spain and a few other Spanish-speaking countries.

In Mexico, hostal is just the Spanish word for hostel: A cheap hotel-like accommodation that will normally have one or two dormitory rooms with bunk beds and a few individual or shared with other rooms. They are ideal for backpackers, youth, and those with little funds for accommodations. Some regular hotels will however add the word hostal to their names to try to increase business.

Hostals are classified from one to three stars, contrary from hostels, which are not classified under the star rating, and from hotels which are classified from one to five stars.

References

External links

Hotel types